Washington's 8th congressional district is a district for the United States House of Representatives located in western Washington State. It includes the eastern portions of King, Pierce, and Snohomish counties, and crosses the Cascade mountains to include Chelan and Kittitas counties. The district's western part includes the exurban communities of Sammamish, Issaquah, and Maple Valley but does not include Seattle and Tacoma's more immediate suburbs. On its east side, the 8th's population centers include the rural communities Wenatchee, Leavenworth, and Ellensburg. It is currently represented in the U.S. House of Representatives by Democrat Kim Schrier, who was first elected to the seat in 2018.

Creation

The 8th district was created after redistricting cycle after the 1980 Census. For its first 30 years, it was centered on the Eastside region of the Seattle metropolitan area. After the 2010 U.S. Census, the state responded to population changes by shifting much of the Eastside to the 9th district. To make up for the loss in population, areas east of the Cascades were shifted to the 8th district.

For the first 35 years of its existence, the district was held by a Republican. At the same time, the 8th district has voted for the Democratic nominee in every presidential election since 1992. Prior to the 2011 redistricting, the district had the peculiarity of having a Democratic advantage according to its Cook PVI, but only having elected Republicans to Congress throughout its history. After the district was pushed into the Cascades with the 2010 redistricting, its PVI became even. The GOP winning streak ended with the 2018 election.

Recent history

2004
In 2004, Dave Reichert, at the time serving as the sheriff of King County, beat his Democratic opponent Dave Ross by 52% to 48% in the race to replace 12-year incumbent Jennifer Dunn; that year, voters in the district favored Democratic presidential candidate John Kerry.

2006
Responding to Reichert's perceived vulnerability, former Microsoft program manager Darcy Burner (D) challenged Rep. Reichert in 2006, in what was widely expected to be a close election. Influential election analyst Charlie Cook listed the contest among 68 competitive or potentially competitive House races to watch in 2006, categorizing it as a "toss-up" (defined as "the most competitive; Either party has a good chance of winning"). Burner was one of 22 House challengers selected by the Democratic Congressional Campaign Committee (DCCC) for fundraising assistance with its "Red to Blue" program, aimed at unseating vulnerable Republican incumbents around the country.

In the end, Reichert won re-election, defeating Burner by just 7,341 votes out of more than 250,000 cast. The outcome of the race was not decided for almost a week after the election, as severe flooding in the eastern part of the district delayed the counting of absentee ballots.

2008
In the 2008 election, Reichert faced Burner again in a rematch that many election watchers again described as one of the nation's hottest contests. This time, Reichert defeated Burner 53 percent to 47 percent, a solid victory despite Barack Obama's 15-point margin in the district.

2010
In the 2010 election, Reichert and Democrat Suzan DelBene advanced out of the Washington State Top 2 Primaries with 47.2% and 26.9% of the vote, respectively. Reichert prevailed over DelBene in the General Election 52.1% to 47.9%. In this election, Reichert won both King and Pierce counties even after losing some key endorsements, including the Seattle Times, which endorsed Suzan DelBene and Tim Dillon in the primaries.

2012
In the 2012 election, Reichert ran against Democrat Karen Porterfield, Associate Dean and Public Administration Lecturer at Seattle University. James Windle of Snoqualmie Pass also ran against Reichert as an independent candidate, but dropped out of the race in August 2012.

2014
In the 2014 election, Reichert defeated Democrat Jason Ritchie, a small business owner from Issaquah.

2016
In the 2016 election, Reichert defeated Democrat Tony Ventrella, a former sportscaster. Ventrella did not think he would beat the other candidates in the field and dropped out in July 2016 only to finish second overall and restart his campaign in the general election.

2018
Reichert announced in September 2017 that he would not seek re-election. Former State Senator and gubernatorial nominee Dino Rossi advanced from the top-two primary alongside pediatrician Kim Schrier. In the general election, Schrier defeated Rossi with 52% of the vote to become the first Democrat to represent the district.

2020
Schrier defeated Republican Jesse Jensen with 52% of the vote, a similar percentage as in 2018.

2022
Schrier defeated Republican Matt Larkin with 53% of the vote.

Election results from statewide races

List of members representing the district

See also
2010 United States House of Representatives elections in Washington
2012 United States House of Representatives elections in Washington
2014 United States House of Representatives elections in Washington
2016 United States House of Representatives elections in Washington
2018 United States House of Representatives elections in Washington
2020 United States House of Representatives elections in Washington
2022 United States House of Representatives elections in Washington

References

Sources

 Congressional Biographical Directory of the United States 1774–present

External links
Washington State Redistricting Commission
Find your new congressional district: a searchable map, Seattle Times, January 13, 2012

08